Arnett is an unincorporated community in southeast McDonald County, in the U.S. state of Missouri. Arnett is located on Missouri Route 90.

History
A post office was established at Arnett in 1898, and remained in operation until 1916.

References

Unincorporated communities in McDonald County, Missouri
Unincorporated communities in Missouri